Robert Pack may refer to:

 Robert Pack (basketball) (born 1969), American basketball player
 Robert Pack (politician) (1786–1860), Newfoundland merchant, politician and justice
 Robert Pack (poet) (born 1929), American poet and critic
 Robert Pack (cricketer) (born 1970), English cricketer

See also
 Robert Packe (1913–1935), English first-class cricketer